Vexin is an historical county of northwestern France. It covers a verdant plateau on the right bank (north) of the Seine running roughly east to west between Pontoise and Romilly-sur-Andelle (about 20 km from Rouen), and north to south between Auneuil and the Seine near Vernon. The plateau is crossed by the Epte and the Andelle river valleys.

History
The name Vexin is derived from a name for a Gaulish tribe now known as the Veliocasses. They had inhabited the area and made Rouen their most important city.

The Norse nobleman Rollo of Normandy (c. 846 – c. 931), the first ruler of the Viking principality that became Normandy, made several incursions into the western half of the county. He halted his actions when the Carolingian king Charles the Simple abandoned the part of the territory that Rollo occupied under the Treaty of Saint-Clair-sur-Epte in 911. The terms of the treaty established the Duchy of Normandy and fixed its boundary with the Kingdom of France along the river Epte. This divided the county of Vexin into two parts:

Norman Vexin (Vexin normand), bounded by the rivers Epte, Andelle and Seine, which became part of the Duchy of Normandy.
French Vexin (Vexin français), bounded by the rivers Epte, Oise and Seine, which remained part of the Île-de-France province.

During the twelfth century, the county of Vexin was a heavily contested border between the Angevin kings of England and Capetian France.  It was of particular importance due to its close proximity to Paris and the location of the route to the coastal cities of Normandy. As a result, Vexin was the site of defensive castle construction, notably at Château Gaillard.

Geography
Today, the county's territory is shared by parts of five departments of France: Val-d'Oise and Yvelines in the Île-de-France region; Oise in the Hauts-de-France region; and Eure and Seine-Maritime in the Normandy region. The major towns are Pontoise, Vernon, Meulan-en-Yvelines, Gisors, and Les Andelys. The plateau is primarily an agricultural region with some manufacturing located in the valleys.

The French Impressionist artist Claude Monet made his home at Giverny, and the Dutch Post-Impressionist Vincent van Gogh painted the wheat fields of Vexin.

A regional nature park was established in the French Vexin in 1995.

In popular culture
Ownership of Vexin, and the court intrigue related to securing it, is a key plot point in James Goldman's play The Lion in Winter (1966). It also features in the Angevin novels of Sharon Kay Penman, and in the BBC series The Devil's Crown (1978), which stars Brian Cox.

References

External links
 Norman B. Leventhal Map Center at the Boston Public Library, Carte du Vexin, Beauvoisis, et Hurepoix, historical map of the Vexin region by Christophe Nicolas Tassin (1634)

Geography of Normandy
Belgae